Danenberg is a surname. Notable people with the surname include:
 Emil C. Danenberg (1917–1982), American musician
 Sophia Danenberg (born 1972), American mountain climber